The Ball Ground Historic District in Ball Ground, Georgia is a  historic district which is roughly bounded by Highway 5 to the west; Commerce Street and Groover Street to the north; Valley Street and Gazaway Lane to the east; and Stripling Street, the southern terminus of Old Canton Road, and Depot Street to the south. It was listed on the National Register of Historic Places October 30, 2009 and included 114 contributing buildings and four contributing sites.

The National Park Service summary description of the area states:

See also
National Register of Historic Places listings in Cherokee County, Georgia

References

Historic districts in Georgia (U.S. state)
National Register of Historic Places in Cherokee County, Georgia
Victorian architecture in Georgia (U.S. state)